Negin Kianfar (born 1969) is an Iranian director, painter and dubbing voice actress, she does voice-over for foreign films, Hollywood productions and television series in Persian.

Filmography
The Birthday (Documentary film) (co-Director)
1 Hour- 99 Years (Documentary film) (co-director)
Eve & Adam (Documentary film) (director)
A New Day (Documentary film) (director)
The Deep Dark Blue (Documentary film) (director)

Samples of dubbing
The Deer Hunter - Linda (Meryl Streep)
Kramer vs. Kramer - Joanna Kramer (Meryl Streep)
Pulp Fiction - Mia Wallace (Uma Thurman)
Spider-Man - Mary Jane Watson (Kirsten Dunst)
Bad Boys - (Téa Leoni)
The Devil's Advocate - (Charlize Theron)
The Astronaut's Wife - (Charlize Theron)
Prometheus - (Charlize Theron)
All Saints - (Georgie Parker) TV Series

References

External links
 
 Negin Kianfar's page on Iran-Dubbing 
 

1969 births
Iranian film directors
Persian-language film directors
Iranian actresses
Iranian voice actresses
Living people